Hapaloides is an extinct genus of ground sloth of the family Megalonychidae, endemic to Argentina during the Early Miocene.

Found in the Colhuehuapian-aged Colpodon Beds of Argentina, three species are known: H. ignavus (the type species), H. laevisculus and H. ponderosus, all named by Florentino Ameghino in 1902. H. ignavus is known from a partial cranium that is smaller than that of Hapalops rectangularis, which it was compared to.

Ameghino in 1902 placed Hapaloides in the Megatheriidae, alongside Proschismotherium, which was its sister taxon, while more recent taxonomic reviews place Hapaloides within Megalonychidae.

References 

Prehistoric sloths
Prehistoric placental genera
Miocene mammals of South America
Fossil taxa described in 1902
Golfo San Jorge Basin
Sarmiento Formation
Neogene Argentina